Coln St. Aldwyns (sometimes Coln St. Aldwyn) is a village and civil parish in the Cotswold district of the English county of Gloucestershire.

The designation "St. Aldwyns" (Culna Sancti Aylwini) is attested from the 12th century, and differentiates the village from Coln Rogers and Coln St. Dennis, situated further along the River Coln.  In 1086 in the Domesday book only a single undifferentiated "Culne" is recorded. The name presumably indicates that the church in the village was originally dedicated to St Aylwin, taken to be a form of St Æthelwine, which later became St Aldwyn. At some point between 1535 and 1700 the dedication of the church was changed to St John the Baptist (specifically, to his beheading). The church, in the very south of the parish, was mostly built in the late 12th and early 13th centuries with extensive 19th-century renovations, and is protected as a Grade II* listed building.  It is now in the charge of a team ministry alongside neighbouring parishes.

Governance
Coln St. Aldwyns is part of the Coln Valley ward of the district of Cotswold and is currently represented by Councillor Raymond Theodoulou, a member of the Conservative Party. Coln St. Aldwyns is part of the parliamentary constituency of Cotswold, represented in the House of Commons by Conservative MP Geoffrey Clifton-Brown. Prior to Brexit in 2020, it was part of the South West England constituency of the European Parliament.

References

External links

GENUKI(tm) page

Villages in Gloucestershire
Cotswold District